Sinnappu Moothathamby Rasamanickam (20 January 1913 – 7 September 1974) was a Ceylon Tamil politician and Member of Parliament.

Early life
Rasamanickam was born on 20 January 1913. He was from Mandur in eastern Ceylon.

Career
After his education Rasamanickam joined the government service as an Assistant Food Controller.

Rasamanickam stood as an independent candidate in Paddiruppu at the 1947 parliamentary election but was defeated by S. U. Ethiramanasingham. However, he won the 1952 parliamentary election and entered Parliament. He stood as the Illankai Tamil Arasu Kachchi's (Federal Party) candidate at the 1956 parliamentary election but was again defeated by Ethiramanasingham. He re-gained the seat at the March 1960 parliamentary election. He was re-elected at the July 1960 and 1965 parliamentary elections but was defeated at the 1970 parliamentary election by the United National Party candidate S. Thambirajah.

Rasamanickam was president of ITAK and Tamil United Liberation Front.

References

1913 births
1974 deaths
Illankai Tamil Arasu Kachchi politicians
Members of the 2nd Parliament of Ceylon
Members of the 4th Parliament of Ceylon
Members of the 5th Parliament of Ceylon
Members of the 6th Parliament of Ceylon
People from Eastern Province, Sri Lanka
People from British Ceylon
Sri Lankan Tamil politicians
Tamil United Liberation Front politicians